Kol böreği ("Arm börek") is a Turkish puff pastry prepared in long rolls, traditionally filled with cheese, potatoes, spinach, or meat, and baked at a low temperature. They are named after their long arm-like appearance.

See also
 Çiğ börek
 List of lamb dishes

References

Crimean cuisine
Turkish cuisine
Azerbaijani cuisine
Bosnia and Herzegovina cuisine
Savoury pies
Lamb dishes
Croatian cuisine